Michael Scott, Michael Scot, or Mike Scott may refer to:

Academics
 Michael Scot (1175–c. 1232), mathematician and astrologer
 Michael L. Scott (born 1959), American academic and computer scientist
 Mike Scott, British linguist and designer of WordSmith Tools
 Michael Scott (academic) (fl. c. 2000), British academic at the North East Wales Institute of Higher Education
 J. Michael Scott (born 1941), American scientist, environmentalist and author
 Michael Scott (author) (born 1981), English author, classicist, associate professor and television presenter

Sportspeople
 Michael Scott (golfer) (1878–1959), English amateur golfer
 Michael Scott (footballer) (born 1993), Scottish footballer
 Mick Scott (born 1954), rugby league footballer of the 1980s and 1990s for Wigan, and Halifax RLFC
 Michael Scott (rugby league) (died 1968), rugby league footballer of the 1940s, 1950s and 1960s for England, and Hull F.C.
 Mickey Scott (1947–2011), professional baseball player
 Mike Scott (baseball) (born 1955), American pitcher
 Mike Scott (basketball) (born 1988), American basketball player
 Michael Scott (basketball) (born 1986), American basketball player
 Michael Scott (sports administrator) (born 1956), Australian sports administrator
 Michael Scott (cricketer) (born 1933), English cricketer

Authors
 Michael Scott (novelist) (1789–1835), Scottish author
 Michael Scott (Irish author) (born 1959), Irish author
 Michael Scott Rohan (1951–2018), Scottish fantasy and science fiction author

Entertainment
  Michael Scott (The Office), fictional character in the American TV series The Office, played by Steve Carell
 Michael Scott (musician) (born 1971), American musician
 Mike Scott (Scottish musician) (born 1958), Scottish musician/songwriter, founder of The Waterboys
 Mike Scott (broadcaster) (1932–2008), British TV presenter
 Mike Scott (English musician), hardcore/punk songwriter, Vocalist of Lay It on the Line, ex-Phinius Gage
 Michael T. Scott (born 1977), American comedy writer and animation director
 Michael Scott, early stage name for British actor Michael Caine (born 1933)
 Michael James Scott (born 1981), American actor and singer
 Michael J. F. Scott, Canadian film and television producer and director
 Michael Scott (artistic director) (c. 1935–2019), founder of the London Opera Society
 Michael Scott (director) (born 1955), American film director, producer and documentary filmmaker

Politicians
 Michael Scott (British Army officer) (born 1941), former U.K. Military Secretary
 Mike Scott (politician) (born 1954), Canadian parliamentarian
 Michael Scott Jr. (born 1975), Chicago alderman

Other people
 Michael Dishington Scott, chief justice of Tonga
 Michael Scott (Apple) (born 1943), first CEO of Apple Computer
 Michael Scott (architect) (1905–1989), Irish architect
 Michael Scott (priest) (1907–1983), opponent of apartheid and advocate of nuclear disarmament
 Michael Scott (diplomat) (1923–2004), British diplomat and colonial administrator

See also